Vester Hornum is a small town in Himmerland, Denmark, with a population of 541 (1 January 2022), located in Vester Hornum parish. The city belongs to the municipality of Vesthimmerland Municipality and is located in the North Jutland region. It also have a church and a school. The town also have what they call "Vester Hornum løberne" (English:Vester Hornum runners) and it is a union of exerciseists who regularly gather for joint exercise in the form of running. The name of Vester Hornum translate into Western Hornum since it is west from Hornum.

References

Villages in Denmark
Towns and settlements in Vesthimmerland Municipality